Sacrorum, a Latin word meaning a sacred oath or rite, may refer to:
Rex Sacrorum, the office of the highest-ranking priest under the Roman Kingdom
Sacrorum Antistitum, an oath against modernism issued by the Roman Catholic Pope Pius X in 1910